Pollanisus cupreus is a moth of the family Zygaenidae. It is found in the Australian state of Western Australia.

The larvae probably feed on Hibbertia hypericoides.

External links
Australian Faunal Directory
Zygaenid moths of Australia: a revision of the Australian Zygaenidae

Moths of Australia
cupreus
Moths described in 1854